Callum Phillips is a Scotland international rugby league footballer who plays as a  or  for Whitehaven in Betfred League 1.

Background
Phillips was born in Whitehaven, Cumbria, England.

Club career
Born in Whitehaven, Phillips started his career as an amateur playing for Seaton. He was named Gillette National Youth League player of the year in 2010. In November 2012, he signed a professional contract with Workington Town.

He played for Workington Town in Kingstone Press League 1.

Representative career
As an amateur, Phillips played for England Community Lions under-18s. He is eligible to play for Scotland through his grandparents, and was called up to their squad for the 2013 Rugby League World Cup following the withdrawal of Gareth Moore due to injury.

In October 2014, Callum was again selected for Scotland but this time he managed to escape injury and play in the 2014 European Cup tournament. He made his International début in the tournament's opening game against Wales. He also managed to score his first International try.

References

External links
Whitehaven profile
2017 RLWC profile

1992 births
Living people
English rugby league players
English people of Scottish descent
Rugby league halfbacks
Rugby league players from Whitehaven
Scotland national rugby league team players
Whitehaven R.L.F.C. players
Workington Town players